Pasindu Bimsara (born 16 December 1996) is a Sri Lankan first-class cricketer. He made his first-class debut for Lankan Cricket Club in Tier B of the 2016–17 Premier League Tournament on 9 December 2016.

References

External links
 

1996 births
Living people
Sri Lankan cricketers
Lankan Cricket Club cricketers
Cricketers from Galle